The 2020–21 FIS Cross-Country Continental Cup (COC) was a season of the FIS Cross-Country Continental Cup, a series of second-level cross-country skiing competitions arranged by the International Ski Federation (FIS).

The 2020–21 Continental Cup contained originally nine different series of geographically restricted competitions; five in Europe, two in North America and one each from Asia and Oceania. Two tournament in North America and Canada (US Super Tour and Nor-Am Cup), one tournament in Europe (Scandinavian Cup) and the tournament from Oceania (Australia/New Zealand Cup) were cancelled due to COVID-19 pandemic.

Winners
The overall winners from the 2020–21 season's Continental Cups are rewarded a right to start in the first period in the following 2021–22 World Cup season.

Results

Men

Alpen Cup

Balkan Cup

Eastern Europe Cup

Far East Cup

Slavic Cup

Scandinavian Cup

US Super Tour

Nor-Am Cup

Women

Alpen Cup

Balkan Cup

Eastern Europe Cup

Far East Cup

Slavic Cup

Scandinavian Cup

US Super Tour

Nor-Am Cup

References

Sources

 
FIS Cross-Country Continental Cup seasons
2020 in cross-country skiing
2021 in cross-country skiing